Kwon Un-sil (born September 17, 1983 in Hamhung, South Hamgyong) is an athlete from North Korea who competes in archery.

2008 Summer Olympics
At the 2008 Summer Olympics in Beijing Kwon finished her ranking round with a total of 656 points. This gave her the 5th seed for the final competition bracket in which she faced Najmeh Abtin in the first round, beating the archer from Iran with 106–96. In the second round she was too strong for Pranitha Vardhineni with 106-99 and via Aida Román (105-100) she achieved her place in the quarter final. There she eliminated another Mexican, Mariana Avitia with 105-99 to go on to the semi final. In the semi final Kwon was unable to beat first seed Park Sung-hyun who won the match 109–106. Kwon could still win the bronze medal against another South Korean Yun Ok-hee, but eventually lost again with 109-106 to finish just outside the medals.

2012 Summer Olympics

Kwon qualified for the 2012 Summer Olympics, but lost in the first round to Natalia Valeeva.

References

1983 births
Living people
Archers at the 2008 Summer Olympics
Archers at the 2012 Summer Olympics
Olympic archers of North Korea
North Korean female archers
People from Hamhung
Asian Games medalists in archery
Archers at the 2006 Asian Games
Archers at the 2010 Asian Games
Asian Games bronze medalists for North Korea
Medalists at the 2010 Asian Games
21st-century North Korean women